Millie Bobby Brown (born 19 February 2004) is a English actress and producer. She gained recognition for playing Eleven in the Netflix science fiction series Stranger Things (2016–present), for which she received nominations for two Primetime Emmy Awards. Brown has starred in the monster film Godzilla: King of the Monsters (2019) and its sequel Godzilla vs. Kong (2021). She also starred in and produced the Netflix mystery film Enola Holmes (2020) and its 2022 sequel.

In 2018, Brown was featured in the Time 100 list of the world's most influential people, and was appointed as a UNICEF Goodwill Ambassador, the then youngest person selected for this position.

Early life
Brown was born in Marbella, Málaga, Spain, on 19 February 2004, the third of four children born to British parents Kelly and Robert Brown, an estate agent. She was born with partial hearing loss in her left ear and gradually lost all hearing in that ear over several years. She moved with her family back to England when she was four, settling in Bournemouth; when she was eight, the family moved to Orlando, Florida.

Career

2013–2017: Early roles and Stranger Things 
In 2013, Brown made her acting debut as a guest star in the ABC fantasy drama series Once Upon a Time in Wonderland, a spin-off of Once Upon a Time, portraying the role of Young Alice. In 2014, she had a starring role in the BBC America paranormal drama-thriller series Intruders as Madison O'Donnell. She made guest appearances in the CBS police procedural drama NCIS, the ABC sitcom Modern Family, and the ABC medical drama series Grey's Anatomy.

In 2016, Brown was cast to play Eleven in the Netflix science fiction horror series Stranger Things. She received critical praise for her performance and she was nominated for the Screen Actors Guild Award for Outstanding Performance by a Female Actor in a Drama Series and the Primetime Emmy Award for Outstanding Supporting Actress in a Drama Series. She then won the Screen Actors Guild Award for Outstanding Performance by an Ensemble in a Drama Series with her co-stars and won the 43rd Saturn Award for Best Performance by a Younger Actor in a Television Series. For her role as Eleven in the second season of Stranger Things, she received her second nominations for a Screen Actors Guild Award and a Primetime Emmy Award in 2018.

In November 2016, Brown starred in the music video for Sigma and Birdy's single "Find Me". Since November 2016, she has appeared in commercial advertisements for investment and financial service company Citigroup. In January 2017, she made her modelling debut in Calvin Klein's "By Appointment" campaign. The following month, she was signed to the agency IMG Models. Brown appeared in the campaign of the Italian brand Moncler in the summer of 2018. Brown has also made appearances on the cover of Vogue.

2018–present 
She was chosen to voice in the Darren Aronofsky-produced virtual reality experience Spheres: Songs of Spacetime. In 2018, she was named one of the 100 most influential people in the world by Time magazine, becoming the youngest person to be included in the list. In addition she was named by Time magazine as one of the most influential teens of 2017 and of 2018. That year, she become the youngest person ever to be appointed a UNICEF Goodwill Ambassador. EA Games announced that Brown collaborated with The Sims 4 programmers to feature in the Sims 4 Positivity Challenge. In 2018, The Hollywood Reporter ranked Brown as among Hollywood's top thirty stars under age eighteen.

Brown made her feature film debut in 2019, in Godzilla: King of the Monsters, the sequel to the 2014 film Godzilla. She reprised her role in the next sequel, Godzilla vs. Kong (2021). She became the ambassador of UEFA's Together #WePlayStrong campaign. In 2019, Brown launched "Florence by Mills", her own beauty product line. It is available at UK pharmacy Boots, Walmart in the United States, and Shoppers Drug Mart in Canada. In 2020, Brown starred in and produced the film adaptation of The Enola Holmes Mysteries.

In 2022, Brown earned $10 million to reprise her role as Enola Holmes in the sequel, Enola Holmes 2. Also that year, she was made an ambassador of the fashion brand Louis Vuitton.

Brown will next star and executive produce the fantasy film Damsel for Netflix, under the direction of Spanish filmmaker Juan Carlos Fresnadillo based on a screenplay by Dan Mazeau. She will also star in the Russo brothers's The Electric State, an adaptation of Simon Stålenhag's graphic novel of the same name.

Personal life
Brown came into the public eye at age 12 after being cast in Stranger Things. At age 14, homophobic quotes, falsely attributed to Brown, circulated on social media in meme form which made her eventually quit Twitter because of the harassment. In addition to online bullying, she has also faced social media users and articles sexualizing her. She became frustrated with the experiences, and captioned a 2020 Instagram post on her 16th birthday with the comment "There are moments I get frustrated from the inaccuracy, inappropriate comments, sexualization, and unnecessary insults that ultimately have resulted in pain and insecurity for me." After Brown turned 18 in February 2022, her social media profiles began to be flooded by sexually explicit material from users.

Since 2021, Brown has been in a relationship with actor Jake Bongiovi, son of musician Jon Bon Jovi.

As of August 2022 she was an online student at Purdue University studying health and human services.

Filmography

Film

Television

Music videos

Video games

Awards and nominations

References

External links

 
 

 

2004 births
21st-century English actresses
Actresses from Dorset
Actresses from Florida
British cosmetics businesspeople
British expatriates in the United States
British film producers
Citizens of the United Kingdom through descent
English child actresses
English film actresses
English television actresses
Living people
People from Bournemouth
UNICEF Goodwill Ambassadors